André Wojciechowski (born 17 April 1956 in Créhange, Moselle) is a member of the National Assembly of France.  He represents the Moselle department,  and is a member of the Radical Party.

Origins 
He is the first Polish French Mayor of a French town near the German-French border.

References

1956 births
Living people
People from Moselle (department)
French people of Polish descent
Radical Party (France) politicians
Mayors of places in Grand Est
Deputies of the 13th National Assembly of the French Fifth Republic
Union of Democrats and Independents politicians